Moskovsky City District is a district of the city of Tver, Tver Oblast, Russia. Population: 

In 1975, Proletarsky City District and parts of Novopromyshlenny City District of Tver were merged to form Tsentralny City District, and the remaining part of Novopromyshlenny City District was renamed Moskovsky.  The name was given because the road to Moscow starts on the city district's territory.

References

Tver